Weethley is a village and former civil parish on the B4088 road, now in the parish of Arrow with Weethley, in the Stratford-on-Avon district, in the county of Warwickshire, England. Weethley has a chapel of ease called St James's, Weethley. In 2001 the parish had a population of 17. On 1 April 2004 the parish was abolished and merged with Arrow to form "Arrow with Weethley".

References

External links 
 British history online

Villages in Warwickshire
Former civil parishes in Warwickshire
Stratford-on-Avon District